Kurt Leitner (21 March 1946 – 7 October 2018) was an Austrian footballer and manager. He played in one match for the Austria national football team in 1971.

References

External links
 

1946 births
2018 deaths
Austrian footballers
Austria international footballers
Place of birth missing
Association footballers not categorized by position
Austrian football managers
First Vienna FC managers